The Riesz theorem may refer to any of several mathematical theorems due to brothers Frigyes Riesz and Marcel Riesz:

 F. and M. Riesz theorem
 F. Riesz's theorem – Characterizes finite-dimensional Hausdorff topological vector spaces (TVSs). 
 Riesz representation theorem
 M. Riesz extension theorem
 Riesz–Thorin theorem
 Riesz–Fischer theorem
 Riesz's lemma
 Riesz–Markov–Kakutani representation theorem